Baudime Jam (born 1972 in Clermont-Ferrand) is a French violist, composer and musicologist.

Biography 
He has made himself known by composing original scores for accompanying silent films, performing numerous transcriptions for string quartet, as well as his research on the composer George Onslow, to whom he has devoted two works and several articles.

He is the founder and violist of the Prima Vista Quartet in which he has performed in France and abroad since 1997.

Composer

Soundtracks

Feature films 
 The General (Buster Keaton)
 Nosferatu (Friedrich Murnau)
 The Black Pirate (Douglas Fairbanks)
 Orphans of the Storm (David Griffith)
 The Goddess (Wu Yonggang)
  (André Sauvage)
 Deux Étoiles dans la voie lactée (Shi Dongshan)
 Wings (William Wellman)
 La Grande Guerre :
 La Femme française pendant la guerre (Alexandre Devarennes)
 Les Enfants de France pendant la guerre (Henri Desfontaines)
 No Man's land (archives ECPAD)
 Dr Jekyll & Mr Hyde (John Robertson)

Short films 
 The Haunted House (Buster Keaton)
 One Week (Buster Keaton)
 The Immigrant (Charlie Chaplin)
 A Film Johnnie (George Nichols)
 L'Arrivée d'un train en gare de La Ciotat (Louis Lumière)
 Le Barbier fin de siècle (Pathé)
 Premier prix de violoncelle (Pathé)
 La Course des sergents de ville (André Heuzé)
  (Gaston Velle)
 Au royaume de l'air (Walter Lantz)
 Le Dîner de Félix le Chat (Otto Messmer)
 Le Rhône, de Genève à la mer (Louis-Ernest Favre)
 Les Hallucinations d'un pompier (anonymous) : 5 variations on the song J'ai deux amours by Vincent Scotto.

Arranger 
 La Nouvelle Babylone (G. Kosinzew & L. Trauberg): Transcription for string quartet and clarinet of Shostakovich's score.
 Le Club des menteurs (C. Bowers.): Montage and sequence of themes from the classical repertory

Cycles of melodies 
 Les Horizons perdus
 Les Chants de l’Innocence

Tales in music 
 La Petite musique du diable
 La Tortue rouge
 Hulul
 Mais je suis un ours !

Publications 
 George Onslow, Les Éditions du Mélophile, Clermont-Ferrand, September 2003, 560 pages. 
 Henri Thévenin, le compositeur oublié de Vichy, Études bourbonnaises, n° 302, June 2005, 
 Les Origines anglaises des Onslow, in Edouard Onslow : Un peintre en Auvergne, Un Deux Quatre éditions, 2005, 
 Silent music : mythes et réalités
 George Onslow & l'Auvergne, Les Éditions du Mélophile, July 2011. 400 pages + 72 page color iconographic booklet.

References

External links 

 Site officiel du Quatuor Prima Vista - concerts
 Site officiel du Quatuor Prima Vista - ciné-concerts
 Baudime Jam et George Onslow
 UCMF
 Silent Era
 Wings in the USA

20th-century French composers
French film score composers
French classical violists
21st-century French musicologists
1972 births
Writers from Clermont-Ferrand
Living people
Musicians from Clermont-Ferrand
20th-century violists